Roller sports are sports that use human powered vehicles which use rolling either by gravity or various pushing techniques. Typically ball bearings and polyurethane wheels are used for momentum and traction respectively, and attached to devices or vehicles that the roller puts his weight on. The international governing body is World Skate.

List 

Roller sports include the following disciplines

 Inline skating
 Vert Skating
 Aggressive inline skating
 Inline freestyle skating
 Inline figure skating
 Inline hockey
 Inline skater hockey
 Inline speed skating
 Roller soccer
 Inline alpine skating

 Roller skating
 Artistic roller skating
 Roller speed skating
 Drafting
 Jam skating
 Roller derby
 Rink hockey

 Road skating
 Roller skiing
 Dry ski slope
 Grass skiing
 Indoor ski slope
 Roller cross-country skiing
 Roller alpine skiing

 Skateboarding
 Freestyle skateboarding
 Skateboarding trick
 Street skateboarding
 Park skateboarding

 Freestyle scootering

World Roller Games disciplines
Since 2017 World Skate has organised the World Roller Games, a biennial competition that now includes 11 world championships in one single event. 
List of events:
 Alpine Skating
 Artistic roller skating
 Downhill Skateboarding
 Inline Freestyle
 Inline Hockey
 Rink Hockey
 Roller Derby
 Roller Freestyle
 Skateboarding
 Inline speed skating

Olympic Disciplines
Skateboarding events have been introduced for the 2020 Summer Olympics, with two events: park and street. Much like BMX cycling, the park event will feature what resembles an empty swimming pool. Competitors will have three timed runs for tricks. On street, there will be ramps and rails for routines and tricks. There will be a total of 80 total spots, with 20 in each event. Each country can enter a maximum of three athletes in each event.

World Games Disciplines
On the programme for the 2021 World Games to be held in Birmingham, Alabama there are 4 roller sports disciplines; Artistic, Inline hockey, Speed Skating Road and Speed Skating track. Roller sports is the only sport on the World Games programme represented in three clusters. Speed Skating belongs to "Trend Sports", Artistic to "Artistic Sports" and Inline Hockey to "Ball Sports".

References

External links

 
Sports by type